Deeds of the Ever-Glorious is a 1978 fantasy role-playing game supplement.

Contents
Deeds of the Ever-Glorious outlines the histories of 85 of the legions in the Empire of Tsolyanu.

Reception
Frederick Paul Kiesche III reviewed Deeds of the Ever-Glorious in Space Gamer No. 71. Kiesche commented that "Deeds is an excellent supplement for those involved with EPT/S&G.  Much of the history given can be used in campaigns on Tekumel, to embellish adventures, fill in backgrounds, etc.  Highly recommended."

References

Fantasy role-playing game supplements
Role-playing game supplements introduced in 1978
Tékumel